Get Up! Get Live! (stylized as GETUP! GETLIVE!) is a Japanese media mix project developed by MBS centered on comedy. The concept is developed by Seitarō Mukai from the comedy duo Tenshin and written by Wataru Watari.  The series aired from July 10 to September 11, 2020 on the Super Animeism block.

Plot

Several aspiring comedians who join SSS, a talent agency, in hopes of becoming the greatest entertainers in Japan, while facing rejection and jealousy during their struggles.

Characters

Stardust

Kikuichimonji

6

Hayashima

Other characters

Development

The concept is developed by Seitarō Mukai from the comedy duo Tenshin and written by Wataru Watari. The project was first revealed in March 2019, with the voice actors' first live stand-up event taking place on May 18, 2019. Their second stand-up event took place on February 2 and February 9, 2020.

Media

Anime
A television anime adaptation was announced in April 2020 and aired from July 10 to September 11, 2020 on the Super Animeism programming block on MBS and TBS. The series is directed by 88 and written by Takashi Ifukube. The music direction is handled by Taka and the animation is produced by Spellbound. Episode 0 of the series was broadcast on July 3, 2020.

Manga
Two manga adaptations of the series were launched in the magazines Comic Zero Sum and Zero-Sum Online.

References

External links
 

Anime with original screenplays
Animeism
Comedy anime and manga
Fictional comedians